The Aermacchi AL-60 is a light civil utility aircraft of the late 1950s and early 1960s, originally designed by Al Mooney of Lockheed in the United States. After the company decided not to build the aircraft in the US, it was manufactured in small quantities in Mexico, and a few were assembled in Argentina (Santa Isabel, Córdoba) by Aviones Lockheed-Kaiser Argentina. It was also built in quantity under licence by Aermacchi in Italy and Atlas Aircraft Corporation in South Africa.

Design and development
In the late 1950s, the American aircraft designer Al Mooney, who had recently joined Lockheed after leaving the company that bore his name, was given the task of designing a utility aircraft, the CL-402, suitable for use in underdeveloped countries. As Lockheed could not build the design at an economic price in the United States, it was instead intended for the aircraft to be built under licence outside the United States, where labour costs were lower. The first prototype CL-402, powered by a  Continental IO-470-G engine, flew for the first time at Lockheed's Marietta, Georgia on 15 September 1959, with a second prototype, powered by a turbocharged TSIO-470-B engine rated at  followed a few months later. 

The initial production deal was made with Mexico, where a joint venture,  Lockheed-Azcarate SA (LASA) was set up to build the CL-402 as the LASA-60, with a factory being built near San Luis Potosí. Type certification by the US Federal Aviation Administration was received on 5 April 1960. While it was planned that 240 aircraft would be built by LASA by 1963, the type was less popular than hoped, with LASA stopping production in April 1962. LASA built 41 LASA-60s, with 18 aircraft purchased by the Mexican Air Force.

A second joint venture was set up with Argentina, between Lockheed and Industrias Kaiser Argentina, with the name Aviones Lockheed-Kaiser. Production began of a batch of 16 aircraft in 1961, but was stopped after 11 had been completed.
 
In Italy, Aermacchi purchased a licence to produce the type, first in its original configuration as the AL-60B, then in a modified version for various African customers as the AL-60C. This latter version changed from the original tricycle undercarriage to a taildragger arrangement.

The AL-60C version was built under license by Atlas Aircraft Corporation in South Africa. This aircraft was known as Atlas C4M Kudu. Over 40 aircraft were built and served the South African Air Force between 1974 and 1991.

A number of C4M Kudu aircraft are still flying privately and have proven well in the role of skydive release aircraft. They have been re-engined with turbine engines. This design is known as the Atlas Angel or Turbine Kudu.

In 1968 Macchi sold the rights to the aircraft to Northwest Industries of Edmonton, Alberta, Canada and the design was developed into the Northwest Ranger, with development continuing until 1972.

Variants

L-402
Lockheed prototypes and a few assembled by Kaizer
LASA-60
Mexican production model (44 built)
AL-60B-1 Santa Maria
Original Aermacchi-built version (4 built)
AL-60B-2 Santa Mari
Production Aermacchi version (81 built)
AL-60C-5 Conestoga
Aermacchi-built version for the Central African Republic
AL-60F-5 Trojan
Aermacchi-built version for Rhodesia (~10 units)
Atlas C4M Kudu
Atlas-built version for South Africa

Operators

Central African Republic Air Force

Italian Air Force  operated one Aermacchi AL-60 from 1962 until 1963

Mexican Air Force

Military of Mauritania

Rhodesian Air Force

South African Air Force

Air Force of Zimbabwe

Specifications (AL-60B2)

See also

References

Notes

Bibliography

 Taylor, John W. R. Jane's All The World's Aircraft 1961–62. London: Sampson Low, Marston & Company, 1961.
 Taylor, John W. R. Jane's All The World's Aircraft 1966–67. London: Sampson Low, Marston & Company, 1966.

External links

 photograph and details (in Spanish) of the sole Chilean example, c/n 1002
 AL60 photographs and info in Rhodesia
 Atlas Kudu Survivors List with Pictures
 Aircraft.co.za - Aermacchi AL-60 / Atlas Kudu

Kudu
1960s Italian civil utility aircraft
L-0402
AL-60
1950s United States civil utility aircraft
Single-engined tractor aircraft
High-wing aircraft
Aircraft first flown in 1959